Ian Beckstead (born September 7, 1957 in Ottawa, Ontario) is a former Canadian Football League offensive lineman who played eleven seasons in the CFL. He was part of the Grey Cup championship-winning Toronto Argonauts in 1983 and 1991.  He won the Leo Dandurand Trophy in 1988.

Beckstead was originally drafted by the Ottawa Rough Riders in 1981, and was subsequently traded to the Toronto Argonauts in 1983. He sat out part of the 1985 season and all of 1986 to complete his Master of Business Administration degree and begin working in business, but returned to the Argonauts in the 1987 season and played with them for the remainder of his career until retiring after the 1992 season. He was named an East Division All-Star in 1987 and 1988, and a league all-star in 1988. In the latter year, he won the Leo Dandurand Trophy as the Outstanding Offensive Lineman in the East, but lost to West Division's Roger Aldag for the league-wide award.

References

1957 births
Living people
Players of Canadian football from Ontario
Canadian football offensive linemen
Ottawa Rough Riders players
Toronto Argonauts players
Richmond Spiders football players
Canadian football people from Ottawa